St. Michael's Roman Catholic Church, Convent, Rectory, and School is an historic Roman Catholic church complex at 251 Oxford Street in Providence, Rhode Island within the Diocese of Providence.

Description
The main church building is a large structure of red brick with red-sandstone trim. The Lower (basement) Church was designed by Martin & Hall. The Upper Church (nave and tower) was designed by Ambrose J. Murphy. The complete structure was built over a 25-year period ending in 1915.  The rectory, located east of the church, was designed by Ambrose Murphy and built in 1924–25, and is also faced in red brick.  The convent stands west of the church; it is a -story red-brick structure also designed by Murphy and built in 1929.  Behind the convent stands the school building, which faces Gordon Avenue.  It is a two-story red-brick building. The first church building built for St Michael's parish was completed in 1868. It was designed by Ambrose Murphy's uncle, James Murphy (architect).  After completion of the new church, it became the Parish Hall. Unfortunately, it was destroyed by an arson fire in the 1970s.

The complex was listed on the National Register of Historic Places in 1977.

See also

 Catholic Church in the United States
 Catholic parish church
 Index of Catholic Church articles
 National Register of Historic Places listings in Providence, Rhode Island

References

External links
Official site of the Holy See

Churches in the Roman Catholic Diocese of Providence
Churches on the National Register of Historic Places in Rhode Island
National Register of Historic Places in Providence, Rhode Island
Churches in Providence, Rhode Island
Roman Catholic churches in Rhode Island